The 1990 Temple Owls football team was an American football team that represented Temple University as an independent during the 1990 NCAA Division I-A football season. In its second season under head coach Jerry Berndt, the team compiled a 7–4 record and was outscored by a total of 269 to 261. The team played its home games at Veterans Stadium in Philadelphia. 

The team's statistical leaders included Matt Baker with 1,462 passing yards, Scott McNair with 623 rushing yards, Rich Drayton with 564 receiving yards, and placekicker Bob Wright with 85 points scored.

Schedule

References

Temple
Temple Owls football seasons
Temple Owls football